Mayyil is a Census Town and Grama Panchayat in Kannur District of Kerala State. Mayyil Panchayat established in 1962 by merging the villages of Kayaralam, Mayyil and Kandakkai.

Location
Mayyil is situated 20  km North East of District HQ Kannur, 13  km South East of Taliparamba, 20  km North  West of Mattannur, 13  km South West of Sreekandapuram and 16  km West of Irikkur.

Educational institutions
IMNS GHSS, Mayyil
MAYYIL ALP School, Mayyil
Institute of Technology, Mayyil
ITM Arts & Science College, Mayyil
Kayaralam AUP School
Kayaralam North ALP School
ITM Public School, Mayyil
Mayyil Teacher Training Institute, Mayyil
Mullakkodi AUP School, Arimbra, Mullakkodi
Mullakkodi LP School, Mullakkodi
Kandakkai K V A L P school, Kandakkai
Kandakai LP School, Kandakai
Thayampoyil ALP School, Thayampoyi
Perumachery AUP school, Perumachery
Pavannur ALP School, Pavannur
Peruvangoor ALP School, Peruvangoor
Spangle Academy, Professional Training, Kambil
Cherupazhassi ALP School, Cherupazhassi

Temples
Velam maha ganapathi temple
Chekiyattu sree darmashata temple
Chekiyattu sree maha vishnu temple
Nechikottu kavu, Kayaralam
Chalagottu kavu, Kandakkai
Arimbra Subhramanya Temple
Sree Puthiya Bhagavathi Kaavu, Kaavinmoola
Kandanaar Poyil Sree Muchilott Bhagavathi Kshethram, Cherupazhassi
Kadoor Sree Ganapathi Shethram, Kadoor
Udayam kottam shiva kshethram, kadoor ambalam
Nambram Sree Muchilott Bhagavathi Kshethram, Naniyoor Nambram
Kandakkai Kunnummal Muthappan Madappura
Karonnan Kottam, Kayaralam
Thalakkott Muchilott Kavu
Thrikapaleswaram Sree Durga Devi Kshethram, Cherupazhassi

Administration
Mayyil Panchayat is part of Irikkur Block Panchayat. Mayyil is politically a part of Taliparamba Assembly constituency under Kannur Loksabha constituency.

Transportation
The national highway(NH 66) passes through Puthiyatheru (15 km South West), Dharmasala (11 km West), Taliparamba (13 km North West) away from Mayyil Town. Goa and Mumbai can be accessed on the northern side and Cochin and Thiruvananthapuram can be accessed on the southern side.  The road to the east of Iritty connects to Mysore and Bangalore.   The nearest railway station is Kannur on Mangalore-Palakkad line. 
Trains are available to almost all parts of India subject to advance booking over the internet.  There are airports at Mattanur, Mangalore and Calicut. All of them are international airports but direct flights are available only to Middle Eastern countries. Newly inaugurated Kannur International Airport (Mattannur) is 22 km away from Mayyil, and the proposed 4 line airport road from Taliparamba to Mattannur passes through Mayyil.

Demographics
As of 2011 Indian census, Mayyil census town had population of 12,490 among which 5,768 are males and 6,722 are females. Population of age group in 0-6 was 1,557 (12.5%) which constitutes 771 males and 786 females. Literacy rate of Mayyil town was 92.7% lower than state average of 94% where male literacy was 96.2% while female literacy rate was 89.7%.

Mayyil panchayat has administration over Mayyil census town (urban) and Kayaralam village (rural).

Religion
As of 2011 India census, Mayyil census town had total population of 12,490 which constitute 59.8% Hindus, 40% Muslims and 0.2% others.

Geography
Mayyil is surrounded by around half of its boundary by Valapattanam river.

Libraries
Almost every road in this grama panchayat in Kerala's Kannur district leads to or ends with a library.

References

Cities and towns in Kannur district

External links